Cliff Nuttall (born 31 December 1940) is a Canadian hurdler. He competed in the men's 110 metres hurdles at the 1964 Summer Olympics.

References

1940 births
Living people
Athletes (track and field) at the 1964 Summer Olympics
Canadian male hurdlers
Olympic track and field athletes of Canada
Place of birth missing (living people)